Kevin Münch (born 27 July 1988) is a German darts player.

Career

Münch reached the last 40 of the 2011 Winmau World Masters before losing to Colin Fowler.

Münch qualified for the 2012 PDC World Darts Championship after winning the German Qualifier, defeating Bernd Roith 10–8 in the final. He defeated Malaysia's Lee Choon Peng 4–2 in the preliminary round. In the first round, he played Denis Ovens, and won the first set 3–0 before Ovens was forced to retire from the match due to a back injury. He played Steve Farmer in the second round and although he led 2–1, with chances to go to 3–1, he would lose the match 4–2. In June, he earned a place in the German Darts Championship in Berlin by defeating Alexander Tauber and Maik Langendorf in the Home Nation Qualifier. Münch played Brendan Dolan in the first round and lost 6–4. 
He also qualified for the European Darts Open with a win over Michael Rosenauer. Münch played Dave Chisnall in the first round in Düsseldorf and, after winning the opening leg, lost 6–1. He qualified for the remaining two European Tour Events of the season, but lost in the first round on both occasions.

He briefly returned to the British Darts Organisation, but returned to the PDC in 2015 and went on to qualify for the 2015 European Darts Grand Prix and 2016 European Darts Trophy, where he was knocked out in the first round.

On 19 December 2017 at the 2018 PDC World Darts Championship, in a major upset Münch defeated former two-time champion Adrian Lewis in the first round 3–1, before losing out to Toni Alcinas of Spain in the Last 32.

World Championship results

PDC

2012: Second round (lost to Steve Farmer 2–4)
 2018: Second round (lost to Toni Alcinas 1–4)

Performance timeline

PDC

References

External links

1988 births
Living people
German darts players
Sportspeople from Bochum
Professional Darts Corporation associate players
British Darts Organisation players
21st-century German people